Walk Hard: The Dewey Cox Story is a 2007 American comedy film directed by Jake Kasdan, and written by Kasdan and co-producer Judd Apatow. It stars John C. Reilly, Jenna Fischer, Tim Meadows and Kristen Wiig. A parody of the biopic genre, Walk Hard is the story of a fictional early rock and roll star played by Reilly.

Walk Hard primarily references the musical biopics Ray (2004) and Walk the Line (2005); in addition to Ray Charles and Johnny Cash, the "Dewey Cox" character includes elements of the lives and careers of other notable musicians including Roy Orbison, Glen Campbell, Bob Dylan, Jerry Lee Lewis, Donovan, John Lennon, James Brown, Jim Morrison, Conway Twitty, Neil Diamond, Hank Williams, and Brian Wilson. The film portrays fictional versions of artists Buddy Holly, The Big Bopper, Elvis Presley, and the Beatles; some artists appear as themselves, including Eddie Vedder, Jewel and Ghostface Killah. In addition, the film parodies or pays tribute to the musical styles of David Bowie, Billy Joel, Van Dyke Parks, The Gun Club, and seventies punk rock.

The film was released in North America on December 21, 2007. It received positive reviews from critics but was a box office bomb, grossing only $20 million against a $35 million budget. The film has since become a cult classic.

Plot
In Springberry, Alabama, 1946, young Dewey Cox accidentally cuts his brother Nate in half with a machete. The trauma causes him to lose his sense of smell. Dewey meets a blues guitarist who discovers his life experience instilled in him a natural affinity for playing blues.

In 1953, Dewey performs at a school talent show and drives the crowd wild with his song "Take My Hand," and his father kicks him out of the house, calling it the "Devil's music". A 14-year-old Dewey leaves Springberry with his 12-year-old girlfriend Edith; they soon marry and have a baby. 

Working at an all-African American nightclub, Dewey replaces singer Bobby Shad onstage and impresses Hasidic Jew record executive L'Chaim. While recording a rockabilly rendition of "That's Amore", he is berated by an executive. A desperate Dewey performs "Walk Hard," a song inspired by a speech he gave Edith, which restores the executive's belief in Judaism and rockets him to superstardom.

The song quickly becomes a hit and Dewey becomes caught up in the rock 'n' roll lifestyle. He soon performs his first concert as the following act to Elvis Presley, Buddy Holly, and The Big Bopper. Dewey is introduced to marijuana by his drummer Sam and becomes unfaithful to Edith. Dewey's father informs him that his mother has died while dancing to Dewey's song and blames Dewey's music for her death. 

Distraught, Dewey finds Sam using cocaine and partakes, resulting in a cocaine-fueled punk rock performance. Choir-girl Darlene Madison enters Dewey's life, and he produces several sexually suggestive hit records amid their courtship. He weds Darlene while still married to Edith, which leads to both women leaving him, after which Dewey purchases drugs from an undercover cop. After he serves time in prison and in rehab, Darlene returns.

They move to Berkeley, California in 1966 during the counterculture movement. Dewey's new singing style is compared to that of Bob Dylan, which he angrily denies. In the next scene, a music video shows that Dewey's new song mimics Dylan's style, including opaque lyrics ("The mouse with the overbite explained/how the rabbits were ensnared/ and the skinny scanty sylph/ trashed the apothecary diplomat/ inside the three-eyed monkey/ within inches of his toaster-oven life."). On a band visit to India, Dewey takes LSD with the Beatles, leading to a Yellow Submarine-esque hallucination. 

Dewey becomes consumed with creating his masterpiece Black Sheep (a homage to Brian Wilson's Smile). The band resents his insane musical style and abusive behavior and breaks up; Darlene, also unable to deal with him, leaves him for Glen Campbell. During another stint in rehab, Dewey is visited by the ghost of Nate, who ridicules his self-pity and tells him to start writing songs again.

In the 1970s, Dewey now hosts a CBS variety television show but is unable to compose a masterpiece for his brother. Nate reappears and urges him to reconcile with their father. Dewey and his father wind up dueling with machetes; despite having trained years for this moment, his father cuts himself in half, forgives Dewey for Nate's death, tells him to be a better father, and dies. Dewey breaks down and destroys almost everything in his home.

Dewey is approached by one of his illegitimate children and decides to reconnect with his many offspring. In 1992, a divorced Darlene returns to him. Finally realizing what is most important, Dewey regains his sense of smell and remarries her.

In 2007, L'Chaim's son Dreidel informs Dewey of his popularity with young listeners through rapper Lil' Nutzzak's sampling of "Walk Hard." Dewey learns he is to receive a lifetime achievement award. They want him to sing a song at the ceremony, but Dewey is reluctant, fearing his old temptations. However, with his family's support, he reunites with his band and is finally able to create one great masterpiece, summing up his entire life with his final song, "Beautiful Ride."

A title card reveals that Dewey died three minutes after this final performance, which then also reads "Dewford Randolph Cox, 1936–2007." A post-credits scene is a short black-and-white clip of "the actual Dewey Cox, April 16, 2002" (still played by Reilly).

Cast

 John C. Reilly as Dewey Cox 
 Kristen Wiig as Edith Cox
 Raymond J. Barry as Pa Cox
 Margo Martindale as Ma Cox
 Jenna Fischer as Darlene Madison Cox
 Angela Correa as Darlene's singing voice
 Tim Meadows as Sam McPherson, drummer and drug dealer
 Chris Parnell as Theo
 Matt Besser as Dave
 Chip Hormess as Nate Cox, Dewey's brother
 Jonah Hill (uncredited) as older Nate
 David "Honeyboy" Edwards as the Old Blues Singer
 David Krumholtz as Schwartzberg
 Craig Robinson as Bobby Shad
 Harold Ramis as L'Chaim
 Simon Helberg as Dreidel L'Chaim
 Philip Rosenthal as Mazeltov
 Martin Starr as Schmendrick
 John Michael Higgins as "Walk Hard" recording engineer
 Ed Helms as Stage manager
 Jane Lynch as Gail, the news reporter
 Angela Little Mackenzie as Beth Anne
 Skyler Gisondo as Dewford "Dewdrop/Dewey" Cox, Jr.
 Lurie Poston as a Cox kid
 Jack McBrayer as DJ
 Nat Faxon as Awards show stage manager
 Rance Howard as Preacher
 Odette Yustman as Reefer girl
 Frankie Muniz as Buddy Holly
 John Ennis as The Big Bopper
 Jack White as Elvis Presley
 Adam Herschman as Jerry Garcia
 The Temptations (Otis Williams, Ron Tyson, Terry Weeks, Joe Herndon, Bruce Williamson) as themselves
 Eddie Vedder as himself
 Jackson Browne as himself
 Jewel as herself
 Ghostface Killah as himself
 Lyle Lovett as himself
 Gerry Bednob as Maharishi Mahesh Yogi
 Cheryl Tiegs (unrated version) as herself
 Paul Rudd, Jack Black, Justin Long and Jason Schwartzman (uncredited) as The Beatles (John Lennon, Paul McCartney, George Harrison and Ringo Starr)
 Patrick Duffy (unrated version, uncredited) as himself
 Morgan Fairchild (unrated version, uncredited) as herself
 Cheryl Ladd (unrated version, uncredited) as herself
 Don Was (uncredited) as himself (bass player behind Jackson Browne, Jewel and Lyle Lovett)

Production and development

Jake Kasdan brought the idea to his friend and fellow director Judd Apatow. They then began writing the film together. The tongue-in-cheek references in this fake biopic were drawn from various sources. Apatow and Kasdan noted that they watched various types of biopics for inspiration, including those of Jimi Hendrix and Marilyn Monroe. Despite the humorous approach, the film was crafted in the serious tone of films earmarked for an Oscar, adding to the irony.

John C. Reilly, who actually sings and plays guitar, was chosen to play the title role. "We took the clichés of movie biopics and just had fun with them," Reilly said. The "deliberate miscasting" of celebrity cameos, such as Elvis Presley and the Beatles, was intended to enhance the comedy. The film's poster is a reference to the "young lion" photos of Jim Morrison.

Reception
On Rotten Tomatoes, the film has an approval rating of 74% based on 134, classifying it as "certified fresh". The site's consensus states: "A parody that pokes fun at rock stars and reductive biopics alike, this comedy sings in large part because of stellar performances and clever original music." On Metacritic the film has a score of 63 out of 100 based on reviews from 22 critics.

Roger Ebert gave the film 3 out of 4 stars and wrote: "Instead of sending everything over the top at high energy, like Top Secret! or Airplane!, they allow Reilly to more or less actually play the character, so that, against all expectations, some scenes actually approach real sentiment." Peter Travers of Rolling Stone magazine wrote: "The tricky thing about parody movies is that the jokes get old fast and they're hit-and-miss. Walk Hard, a spoof of every musical biopic from Ray to Walk the Line, is guilty on both counts. How lucky that when the jokes do hit, they kick major ass." A 2022 review of the best comedy films of the 21st century placed this at sixth.

The film was not commercially successful, taking $18 million at the US box office which was less than the film's $35 million budget.

John C. Reilly received a Golden Globe nomination for Best Performance in a Musical or Comedy and a nomination for Best Original Song.

Home media
The film was released on DVD and Blu-ray on April 8, 2008. In the opening weekend, 263,001 DVD units were sold, generating revenue of $5,110,109. As of May 2010, DVD sales have gathered revenue of $15,664,735.

Promotional appearances
Along with a backing band "The Hardwalkers", Reilly made seven musical appearances as Dewey Cox in the weeks prior to the film's release date.

 December 5, 2007 – Rock & Roll Hall of Fame (Cleveland, OH)
 December 6, 2007 – The Cubby Bear (Chicago, IL)
 December 7, 2007 – Stubb's BBQ (Austin, TX)
 December 8, 2007 – Mercy Lounge (Nashville, TN)
 December 10, 2007 – Great American Music Hall (San Francisco, CA)
 December 11, 2007 – The Blacksheep (Colorado Springs, CO)
 December 13, 2007 – Guitar Center on Sunset Blvd. (Los Angeles, CA)
 December 19, 2007 – Knitting Factory (New York, NY)
 December 19, 2007 – Performed in the character of Dewey Cox on Good Morning America.

Several fake commercials were aired including one with John Mayer, hinting Dewey might be his father.

Soundtrack

Singer-songwriters Dan Bern and Mike Viola (of the Candy Butchers) wrote most of the film's songs, including "There's a Change a Happenin'", "Mulatto", "A Life Without You (Is No Life at All)", "Beautiful Ride" and "Hole in My Pants". Charlie Wadhams and Benji Hughes wrote the song "Let's Duet". Marshall Crenshaw wrote the title song, and Van Dyke Parks penned the Brian Wilson-esque 1960s-styled psychedelic jam "Black Sheep" (the recording session seems to be a specific parody of Wilson's Smile album sessions, on which Van Dyke Parks worked). Antonio Ortiz wrote "Take My Hand". A number of critics noted the unusually high quality of many of the individual songs on the soundtrack, how well they reflected the styles and times they were attempting to parody, and how well they stood on their own as quality compositions. The soundtrack was nominated for both a Grammy and Golden Globe Award and was nominated and won the Sierra Award for Best Song in a Motion Picture from the Las Vegas Film Critics Society. John C. Reilly sang on all the tracks and played guitar on most of them.

References

External links

 
 
 

2007 films
2000s parody films
American parody films
American satirical films
Films directed by Jake Kasdan
Films with screenplays by Judd Apatow
The Beatles in film
Films set in Alabama
Films set in California
Films set in the 1940s
Films set in the 1950s
Films set in the 1960s
Films set in the 1970s
Films set in the 1980s
Films set in the 1990s
Films shot in California
Films shot in Los Angeles
Apatow Productions films
Relativity Media films
Columbia Pictures films
Films scored by Michael Andrews
Films produced by Judd Apatow
Films produced by Clayton Townsend
Rockabilly
Cultural depictions of Elvis Presley
Cultural depictions of Buddy Holly
Cultural depictions of the Beatles
2007 comedy films
2000s English-language films
2000s American films